Kiwi is a girl group from Mongolia. The group initially consisted of Ulambayar, Namuun, and Enkhzol. The band was a personal project by producer Angirmaa.

The band has had a total of 6 different members during its 20-year run. The two permanent members during all its iterations were Uka and Namuun. They made their debut with their first album "Khuslee Khelne" in 2006. The group was named the "Best Band" in 2013.

As of 2019, the only active member of the band is Ulambayar. She has gone on to release six solo albums, "I am in love", "11.06", "Khugjim", "Don't Stop", and "Do it".

Kiwi is widely regarded as the best modern girl group in Mongolia since "Lipstick", and "Emotion".

Awards 
 10th Pentatonic awards, 2007, Best Debut Band

 UBS Music Video Awards 2008, Best Debut Single

Discography 
 Хүслээ хэлнэ (2006)
 Гурван сэтгэл нэг хүсэл (2007)
  Гурван сэтгэл нэг хүсэл DVD (2007)
 Чамд Амжилт Хүсье! (2008)
 Чамд Амжилт Хүсье! DVD (2008)
 Хүсэл (2009)
 Таван жил DVD (2010)
  Бидний дурлал (2010)
  I am in love (2011)
  Greatest Hits (2013)
  2014 (2013)
  One moment (2015)
  11.06 (2016)
  Хөгжим (2017)
  Өнгө аяс (2017)
  Удахгүй ээ (2017)
  Don't Stop (2018)
  Do It (2020)
  Ука New album
  Намуун New album
  Киви New album

Lost Songs 
  Гэрэлт-Од (2005)
  Сүүлчийн найраглал (2007)
  Two luv Birds (2011)
  Хар нүдэн бүсгүй
  Сартай шөнө
  Эхийн тухай дуу
  Улирлын сайхан авга
  Зүүдний ханхүү (Miss Mongolia)
  Gun fire
  Хол хайр
  Харгуй замын эхэн адаг
  2014 тоглолтын гадаад дуу

Members 
 "Uka" Ulambayar Davaa (2004-2024)
 "Namuunaa" Namuun Tsolmon() (2004-2024)
 "Agi" Altantsetseg P (2007-2024)

Former members 
 Enkhzol - first member
 Khaliunaa - second member
 Solongo - third member

See also 
 Music of Mongolia

References 

Girl groups
Mongolian women singers
Mongolian musical groups